The echinoderms of Venezuela are a strictly marine animal phylum comprising about 124 species of marine waters designated for Venezuelan Caribbean. The first lists of species for Venezuelan coast date back to 1939 and 1967.

In Venezuela are five classes representatives living today: Crinoidea, Asteroidea, Ophiuroidea, Echinoidea and Holothuroidea. In this list are listed 105 species for the territory Venezuelan.

List of species identified for Venezuela

Crinoidea (Sea Lilies)

Asteroidea (Starfishs)

Ophiuroidea (Sea spiders and sea snakes)

Echinoidea (Sea urchins and sand dollar)

Holothuroidea (Sea Cucumbers)

See also
 List of birds of Venezuela
 List of introduced molluscs of Venezuela
 List of mammals of Venezuela
 List of marine molluscs of Venezuela
 List of molluscs of Falcón State, Venezuela
 List of non-marine molluscs of El Hatillo Municipality, Miranda, Venezuela
 List of non-marine molluscs of Venezuela
 List of Poriferans of Venezuela

Notas

References

External links 
 Venciclopedia - Listado de Equinodermos de Venezuela
 Abundancia de erizo Lytechinus variegatus (Lamarck) en la costa norte, este y oeste de la isla de Margarita (Venezuela)
 Equinodermos del Caribe colombiano I: Crinoidea, Asteroidea y Ophiuroidea. 2012. Milena Benavides Serrato. Giomar Helena Borrero Pérez. Christian Michael Díaz Sánchez. Instituto de Investigaciones Marino Costeras José Benito Vives De Andrèis (IVEMAR). Colombia.  
 Equinodermos del Caribe colombiano II: Echinoidea y Holothuroidea. 2012. Milena Benavides Serrato. Giomar Helena Borrero Pérez. Christian Michael Díaz Sánchez. Instituto de Investigaciones Marino Costeras José Benito Vives De Andrèis (IVEMAR). Colombia. 
 Alvarado, Juan José., y Alfonso S.M., Francisco. (editores) 2013: Echinoderm research and diversity in Latin America. Springer Verlag, Berlin. , 

Venezuela
 Echinoderms
Echinoderms